Engineers' trial may refer to:
Shakhty Trial
Industrial Party Trial